Alfred Iverson Sr. (December 3, 1798March 4, 1873) was a United States representative and Senator from Georgia.

Early life
Born in Liberty County, he attended private schools and graduated from the College of New Jersey (now Princeton University) in 1820. He studied law, was admitted to the bar in 1822 and commenced practice in Clinton, a community in Jones County, Georgia.

Political life
He was a member of the Georgia House of Representatives from 1827 to 1830, and moved to Columbus in 1830 and continued the practice of law. He was judge of the State superior court from 1835 to 1837, a member of the Georgia Senate in 1843–1844, and a presidential elector on the Democratic ticket in 1844.

Iverson was elected as a Democrat to the Thirtieth Congress (March 4, 1847 – March 3, 1849). From 1850 to 1854 he again served as judge of the State superior court, and was elected to the United States Senate and served from March 4, 1855, to January 28, 1861, when he withdrew. While in the Senate he was chairman of the Committee on Claims (Thirty-fifth and Thirty-sixth Congresses). While a senator, he repudiated popular sovereignty. Iverson left the Senate shortly after Georgia passed an ordinance of secession from the United States and after making a defiant farewell speech, stating that Southerners would never return to the Union "short of a full and explicit recognition of the guarantee of the safety of their institution of domestic slavery."

Death and legacy
After leaving the Senate, he resumed the practice of law in Columbus until 1868, when he purchased a plantation in East Macon and engaged in agricultural pursuits until his death there in 1873; interment was in Linwood Cemetery.

His son Alfred Iverson Jr. was a Confederate general in the American Civil War.

References

Other sources

External links 
 Stuart A. Rose Manuscript, Archives, and Rare Book Library, Emory University: Iverson family papers, 1821-1928

1798 births
1873 deaths
People from Liberty County, Georgia
Democratic Party members of the United States House of Representatives from Georgia (U.S. state)
Democratic Party United States senators from Georgia (U.S. state)
1844 United States presidential electors
Democratic Party members of the Georgia House of Representatives
Democratic Party Georgia (U.S. state) state senators
Georgia (U.S. state) state court judges
American slave owners
Princeton University alumni
19th-century American judges
United States senators who owned slaves